Saurashtra may refer to:

 Saurashtra (region), also known as Sorath, a region of Gujarat, India
 Kathiawar Peninsula, also called Saurashtra Peninsula, a peninsula in western India 
 Saurashtra (state), alias United State of Kathiawar, a former Indian state, merged into Bombay State and since its dissolution part of present Gujarat
 Saurashtra Railway a former railway company, merged into Western Railway zone and since its dissolution part of present Indian Railways
 Saurashtra cricket team
 Saurashtra people
 Saurashtra language
 Saurashtra alphabet
 Saurashtra (Unicode block)

See also
 Saraostus, Greek name for Saurashtra
 Sorath (disambiguation)

Language and nationality disambiguation pages